Ghulam Sarwar (born 25 October 1937) is a Pakistani boxer. He competed at the 1960 Summer Olympics and the 1964 Summer Olympics.

References

External links
 

1937 births
Living people
Pakistani male boxers
Olympic boxers of Pakistan
Boxers at the 1960 Summer Olympics
Boxers at the 1964 Summer Olympics
People from Kohat District
Boxers at the 1962 Asian Games
Asian Games competitors for Pakistan
Lightweight boxers
20th-century Pakistani people